Gavin Stephens is a Canadian comedian. He is most noted for his 2021 comedy album All Inclusive Coma, for which he was a Juno Award nominee for Comedy Album of the Year at the Juno Awards of 2022.

He was previously a cast member of the sketch comedy series Comedy Inc. from 2003 to 2007.

References

External links

21st-century Canadian comedians
Canadian stand-up comedians
Canadian sketch comedians
Canadian male comedians
Black Canadian comedians
Canadian podcasters
Comedians from Toronto
Living people
Year of birth missing (living people)